Grease is a 1978 American musical romantic comedy film directed by Randal Kleiser (in his feature directorial debut) from a screenplay by Bronté Woodard and an adaptation by Allan Carr, based on the stage musical of the same name by Jim Jacobs and Warren Casey. The film depicts the lives of greaser Danny Zuko (John Travolta) and Australian transfer student Sandy Olsson (Olivia Newton-John), who develop an attraction for each other during a summer romance.

Grease was released in the United States on June 16, 1978, by Paramount Pictures. The film was successful both critically and commercially, becoming the highest-grossing musical film at the time. Its soundtrack album ended 1978 as the second-best-selling album of the year in the United States, only behind the soundtrack of the 1977 film Saturday Night Fever (which also starred Travolta), and the song "Hopelessly Devoted to You" was nominated for an Academy Award for Best Original Song at the 51st Academy Awards. The film also received five nominations at the 36th Golden Globe Awards, including for Best Motion Picture – Musical or Comedy and two for Best Original Song, for "Grease" and "Hopelessly Devoted to You". In 2020, Grease was selected for preservation in the United States National Film Registry by the Library of Congress as being "culturally, historically, or aesthetically significant".

Launching the franchise of the same name, a sequel, Grease 2, was released in 1982, starring Maxwell Caulfield and Michelle Pfeiffer as a newer class of greasers. Few of the original cast members reprised their roles. As of 2023, a prequel television series, Grease: Rise of the Pink Ladies, and a prequel film, titled Summer Lovin, are in production.

Plot

In the summer of 1958, local boy Danny Zuko and vacationing Australian Sandy Olsson meet at the beach and fall in love. When the summer comes to an end, Sandy frets that they may never meet again, but Danny tells her that their love is "only the beginning".

At the start of the seniors' term at Rydell High School, Danny resumes his role as leader of the T-Birds greaser gang consisting of Doody, Sonny, Putzie, and his best friend Kenickie. Sandy's parents remain in America and enroll Sandy at Rydell where she meets greaser girl clique the Pink Ladies consisting of Frenchy, Marty, Jan and leader Rizzo.

Danny and Sandy recount their brief romance to their respective groups, Sandy recalling a romantic summer and Danny implying a more physical experience. When Sandy finally says Danny's name, Rizzo arranges a surprise reunion at a pep rally where Sandy meets Tom, a jock, and Kenickie unveils his new used car, Greased Lightnin', which he plans on street racing after a restoration. Caught between his feelings and his bad-boy reputation, Danny snubs Sandy in front of his gang and she becomes upset.

At a Pink Ladies pajama party, Sandy falls ill from drinking, trying a cigarette, and having her ears pierced by Frenchy, while Rizzo, after mocking Sandy's wholesome and chaste personality, departs for sex with Kenickie in his car, during which their condom breaks; they are disturbed by Leo, leader of the rival gang, the Scorpions, and his girlfriend Cha-Cha. After the slumber party comes to an end, Sandy realizes she still loves Danny after all.

The next day, Danny apologizes to Sandy for having brushed her off the night earlier and, with Coach Calhoun's help, becomes a runner and successfully wins her back from Tom, but their friends crash their date, and Kenickie and Rizzo break up after an argument. After a disastrous beauty class leaves Frenchy with candy-pink hair, she reluctantly decides to return to Rydell to complete her high-school education.

During the school dance, broadcast live on National Bandstand and hosted by DJ Vince Fontaine, Rizzo and Kenickie spite each other by bringing Leo and Cha-Cha as their dates. In a chaotic hand jive, Danny and Sandy dance well, but just before the winners are announced, Sonny pulls Sandy away and Cha-Cha cuts in to win with Danny, as Sandy storms out. Danny tries to make it up to Sandy by taking her to a drive-in theater but she flees in horror after he attempts to have sex with her. Rizzo fears she is pregnant after missing a period and confides in Marty, who tells Sonny, who inadvertently spreads the rumor to the apparent father Kenickie, though Rizzo denies it to him.

On race day, Kenickie is concussed by his own car door, so Danny takes the wheel, winning the race after Leo spins out. Sandy, watching from afar and delighted with Danny's victory, concludes she still loves him and enlists Frenchy's help in changing her attitude and looks to impress him.

On the last day of school, Rizzo finds she is not pregnant and reunites with Kenickie. Danny and Sandy each find they have changed for each other: Danny has become a letterman, and Sandy a greaser girl. The two depart in the Greased Lightnin' car, which takes flight.

Cast

Principal cast

Protagonists
 John Travolta as Danny Zuko
 Olivia Newton-John as Sandy Olsson

T-Birds
 Jeff Conaway as Kenickie
 Barry Pearl as Doody
 Michael Tucci as Sonny LaTierri
 Kelly Ward as Putzie

Pink Ladies
 Stockard Channing as Betty Rizzo
 Didi Conn as Frenchy
 Jamie Donnelly as Jan
 Dinah Manoff as Marty Maraschino

Secondary cast

Students
 Eddie Deezen as Eugene Felsnic
 Susan Buckner as Patricia "Patty" Simcox
 Lorenzo Lamas as Thomas "Tom" Chisum
 Dennis Cleveland Stewart as Leo "Crater-Face" Balmudo
 Annette Charles as Charlene "Cha-Cha" DiGregorio

School staff
 Eve Arden as Principal McGee
 Dody Goodman as Blanche Hodel
 Sid Caesar as Coach Vince Calhoun
 Alice Ghostley as Mrs. Murdock
 Darrell Zwerling as Mr. Lynch
 Dick Patterson as Mr. Rudie
 Fannie Flagg as Nurse Wilkins

Others
 Joan Blondell as Vi
 Frankie Avalon as Teen Angel
 Edd Byrnes as Vince Fontaine
 Johnny Contardo and Sha Na Na as Johnny Casino & The Gamblers
 Ellen Travolta as a Frosty Palace waitress

Production
Director Randal Kleiser took numerous liberties with the original source material, most notably moving the setting from an urban Chicago setting (based on William Howard Taft High School), as the original musical had been, to a more suburban locale, reflecting his own teenage years at Radnor High School in the suburbs of Philadelphia. He had little control over the musical aspects of the film; his choice of theme song, a composition by Charles Fox and Paul Williams, was overruled when Robert Stigwood and Allan Carr commissioned a song from Stigwood's client Barry Gibb at the last minute.

Casting
John Travolta had previously worked with Stigwood on Saturday Night Fever, recorded the top-10 hit "Let Her In" in 1976, and had previously appeared as Doody in a touring production of the stage version of Grease. He made a number of casting recommendations that Stigwood ultimately accepted, including suggesting Kleiser (who had never directed a theatrical feature before this but had directed Travolta in the 1976 telefilm The Boy in the Plastic Bubble) as director, and Olivia Newton-John, then known almost exclusively as a multiple Grammy winning pop and country singer, as Sandy. Newton-John had done little acting before this film, with only two film credits (1965's Funny Things Happen Down Under and the little-seen 1970 film Toomorrow, which predated her singing breakthrough) to her name up to that time. Before accepting the role, Newton-John requested a screen test for Grease to avoid another career setback. The screen test was done with the drive-in movie scene. Newton-John, who was born in England and spent most of her childhood in Australia, was unable to perform with a convincing American accent, and thus her character was rewritten to be Australian. Before Newton-John was hired, Allan Carr was considering numerous names such as Carrie Fisher, Ann-Margret, Deborah Raffin, Susan Dey and Marie Osmond for the lead role. Osmond almost took the role before she realized the extent to which the character transformed into a rebel and turned it down to star in Goin' Coconuts instead. Newton-John agreed to a reduced asking price in exchange for star billing. In a case of life imitating art, Newton-John's own musical career would undergo a transformation similar to that of the Sandy Olsson character; her next album after Grease, the provocatively titled Totally Hot, featured a much more sexual and pop-oriented approach, with Newton-John appearing on the album cover in similar all-leather attire and teased hair.

Lucie Arnaz auditioned for the part of Rizzo, but a talent client of Carr, Stockard Channing, was cast, several years after her last major film role and debut in The Fortune. At 33 she was the oldest cast member to play a high school student, and Kleiser made her and the other actors playing students take a "crow’s feet test" to see whether they could pass for younger in close-ups. Softer focus was used on some of the older actors' faces. Channing lobbied heavily to keep the climactic song "There Are Worse Things I Could Do" in the score over Carr's objections.

Henry Winkler turned down the role of Danny Zuko for fear of being typecast as a greaser, having been playing the similar bad-boy greaser Arthur Fonzarelli on Happy Days since 1974. Winkler would later regret the decision.

Elvis Presley was considered for the role of The Teen Angel but died before production. Marie Osmond's brother and duet partner Donny Osmond was another potential Teen Angel before Avalon was cast, as was Frankie Valli, who had been given the choice of either singing the theme or appearing as the Teen Angel (he chose the former).

Jeff Conaway, like Travolta, had previously appeared in the stage version of Grease; he had played Danny Zuko during the show's run on Broadway. He did not get to perform Kenickie's featured number "Greased Lightnin'" due to Travolta's influence and desire to have that song for himself. Jamie Donnelly reprised her role as Jan from the Broadway show, the only cast member to do so; as her hair had begun to gray by this point, she had to dye her hair to resemble her stage character. Kelly Ward had previously appeared as a similar sarcastic supporting character in The Boy in the Plastic Bubble with Travolta under Kleiser; he was cast as Putzie, a mostly new character.

Lorenzo Lamas was a last-minute replacement for Steven Ford, who developed stage fright shortly before filming and backed out, and Mark Fidrych, who ran into conflicts with his full-time career as a baseball player. His role contained no spoken dialogue and required Lamas to bleach his hair to avoid looking like one of the T-Birds.

Adult film star Harry Reems was originally signed to play Coach Calhoun; however, executives at Paramount nixed the idea, concerned that his reputation as a porn star would hinder box office returns in the Southern United States, and producers cast Sid Caesar instead. Caesar was one of several veterans of 1950s television (Eve Arden, Frankie Avalon, Joan Blondell, Edd Byrnes, Alice Ghostley, Dody Goodman) to be cast in supporting roles; Paul Lynde was considered for the role Arden ultimately filled. Coincidentally, Frankie Avalon and Randal Kleiser had both appeared in 1966's Fireball 500, the latter as an extra.

Filming locations
The opening beach scene was shot at Malibu's Leo Carrillo State Beach, making explicit reference to From Here to Eternity. The exterior Rydell scenes, including the front parking lot scenes, the auto shop, the “Summer Nights” bleachers number, Rizzo's “There Are Worse Things I Can Do” number, the basketball, baseball, and track segments, and the interior of the gymnastics gym, were shot at Venice High School in Venice, California, during the summer of 1977. The Rydell interiors, including the high school dance, were filmed at Huntington Park High School. The sleepover was shot at a private house in East Hollywood. The Paramount Pictures studio lot was the location of the scenes that involve Frosty Palace and the musical numbers "Greased Lightning" and "Beauty School Dropout". The drive-in movie scenes were shot at the Burbank Pickwick Drive-In (it was closed and torn down in 1989 and a shopping center took its place). The race was filmed at the Los Angeles River, between the First and Seventh Street Bridges, where many other films have been shot. The final scene where the carnival took place used John Marshall High School. Furthermore, owing to budget cuts, a short scene was filmed at Hazard Park in Los Angeles.

Post-production
Scenes inside the Frosty Palace contain obvious blurring of various Coca-Cola signs. Prior to the film's release, producer Allan Carr had made a product placement deal with Coca-Cola's main competitor Pepsi (for example, a Pepsi logo can be seen in the animated opening sequence animated by John David Wilson at Fine Arts Films). When Carr saw the footage of the scene with Coca-Cola products and signage, he ordered director Randal Kleiser to either reshoot the scene with Pepsi products or remove the Coca-Cola logos from the scene. As reshoots were deemed too expensive and time-consuming, optical mattes were used to cover up or blur out the Coca-Cola references. The 'blurring' covered up trademarked menu signage and a large wall poster, but a red cooler with the logo could not be sufficiently altered so was left unchanged. According to Kleiser, "We just had to hope that Pepsi wouldn't complain. They didn't."

Due to an editing error, a closing scene in which Danny and Sandy kiss was removed from the finished print and lost before its theatrical release. The scene was preserved only in black-and-white; Kleiser attempted to have the existing footage colorized and restored to the film for the film's re-release in 1998 but was dissatisfied with the results. The scene is included as an extra on the 40th anniversary home video release, and Kleiser hopes to make another attempt at colorizing the footage that is effective enough for the footage to be inserted into the film as he originally intended by the time the film's 50th anniversary comes in 2028.

Release
Grease was originally released in the United States on June 16, 1978, and was an immediate box-office success. In its opening weekend, the film grossed $8,941,717 in 862 theaters in the United States and Canada, ranking at number 2 (behind Jaws 2) at the box office for the weekend and with the all-time opening weekend records. Despite losing the opening weekend, it topped the box office the following weekend with a gross of $7,867,000 and set a record gross in its first 19 days, with $40,272,000. After 66 days, it had grossed $100 million to become Paramount's second-highest-grossing film, behind The Godfather, and ended its initial run with a gross of $132,472,560, which made it the highest-grossing film in 1978.

In the United States and globally, it became the highest-grossing musical ever at the time, eclipsing the 13-year-old record held by The Sound of Music, with a worldwide gross of $341 million.

In the United Kingdom, it opened with a record $2.2 million in its first eight days. It went on to become the highest-grossing film in the UK, with a gross of £14.7 million.

It was re-released May 18, 1979, in 1,248 theatres in the United States and Canada (except for the New York City area, where it opened a week later), Paramount's biggest ever saturation release at the time, grossing $4.5 million in its opening weekend. The film played for four weeks and was then paired with the PG-rated version of Saturday Night Fever in late June. During the reissue, it overtook The Godfather as Paramount Pictures' highest-grossing film. It was re-released in March 1998 for its 20th anniversary, where it grossed a further $28 million in the United States and Canada.

It remained the highest-grossing live-action musical until 2012 when it was overtaken by Les Misérables, and it remained the US champion until 2017 when it was surpassed by Beauty and the Beast. Discounting inflation, Grease is now the seventh-highest-grossing live-action musical worldwide.

A further re-issue for its 40th anniversary in 2018 grossed $1 million. To date, Grease has grossed $189,969,103 domestically and $206.2 million internationally, totaling $396 million worldwide. Another re-issue took place in select AMC Theatres locations in August 2022 to honor Olivia Newton-John following her death earlier that month, with $1 per sold ticket and the proceeds going to breast cancer research, through a donation by AMC Cares. Similarly, in the UK, selected Merlin Cinemas venues also reissued the film during August, but partnered with Macmillan Cancer Support, with a contribution of £1 per ticket sold.

Reception
Grease received mostly positive reviews from film critics and is considered by many as one of the best films of 1978.

The New York Times Vincent Canby, on its initial release in June 1978, called the film "terrific fun", describing it as a "contemporary fantasy about a 1950s teen-age musical—a larger, funnier, wittier and more imaginative-than-Hollywood movie with a life that is all its own"; Canby pointed out that the film was "somewhat in the manner of Close Encounters of the Third Kind, which recalls the science-fiction films of the '50s in a manner more elegant and more benign than anything that was ever made then, Grease is a multimillion-dollar evocation of the B-picture quickies that Sam Katzman used to turn out in the '50s (Don't Knock the Rock, 1956) and that American International carried to the sea in the 1960s (Beach Party, 1963)." Gene Siskel gave the film three stars out of four, calling it "exciting only when John Travolta is on the screen" but still recommending it to viewers, adding, "Four of its musical numbers are genuine showstoppers that should bring applause." Variety praised the "zesty choreography and very excellent new plus revived music", and thought Travolta and Newton-John "play together quite well." Charles Champlin of the Los Angeles Times was negative, writing, "I didn't see Grease onstage, but on the testimony of this strident, cluttered, uninvolving and unattractive movie, it is the '50s—maybe the last innocent decade allowed to us—played back through a grotesquely distorting '70s consciousness." Gary Arnold of The Washington Post also panned the film, writing, "Despite the obvious attempts to recall bits from Stanley Donen musicals or Elvis Presley musicals or Frankie-and-Annette musicals, the spirit is closer to the New Tastelessness exemplified by Ken Russell, minus Russell's slick visual style ... I've never seen an uglier large-scale musical." David Ansen of Newsweek wrote, "Too often, Grease is simply mediocre, full of broad high-school humor, flat dramatic scenes and lethargic pacing. Fortunately, there's nothing flat about John Travolta ... Travolta can't dominate this movie as he did Fever, but when he's on screen you can't watch anyone else."

Retrospective reviews have generally been positive. In a 1998 review, Roger Ebert gave the film 3 out of 4 stars, calling it "an average musical, pleasant and upbeat and plastic." He found John Travolta's Elvis Presley–inspired performance to be the highlight, but felt that Grease "sees the material as silly camp." In 2018, Peter Bradshaw from The Guardian gave it 5 out of 5 stars, saying "It's still a sugar-rush of a film."

Grease was voted the best musical ever on Channel 4's 100 greatest musicals in 2004. On Rotten Tomatoes the film holds a 76% approval rating based on 75 reviews, with an average rating of 7.00/10. The website's critical consensus reads, "Grease is a pleasing, energetic musical with infectiously catchy songs and an ode to young love that never gets old." On Metacritic, it holds a score of 70 out of 100 based on 15 reviews, indicating "generally favorable reviews".

The film was ranked number 21 on Entertainment Weeklys list of the 50 Best High School Movies.

Home media
Grease was released in the US on VHS by Paramount Home Video in 1979, 1982, 1989, 1992 and 1994; the last VHS release was on June 23, 1998, and was titled the 20th Anniversary Edition following a theatrical re-release that March.

On September 24, 2002, it was released on DVD for the first time. On September 19, 2006, it was re-released on DVD as the Rockin' Rydell Edition, which came with a black Rydell High T-Bird jacket cover, a white Rydell "R" letterman's sweater cover, or the Target-exclusive Pink Ladies cover. It was released on Blu-ray Disc on May 5, 2009.

On March 12, 2013, Grease and Grease 2 were packaged together in a double feature DVD set from Warner Home Video.

In connection with the film's 40th anniversary, Paramount released Grease on 4K Ultra HD Blu-ray, Blu-ray and DVD on April 24, 2018.

Awards and nominations

American Film Institute recognition
 AFI's 100 Years...100 Passions—No. 97
 AFI's 100 Years...100 Songs—No. 70 for "Summer Nights"
 AFI's Greatest Movie Musicals—No. 20

Legacy

Sequel
Grease 2 (1982) stars Maxwell Caulfield and Michelle Pfeiffer. While several of the Rydell High staff characters reprise their roles, the sequel focused on the latest class of graduating seniors, hence most of the principals from Grease did not appear. Patricia Birch, the original film's choreographer, directed the sequel. The original musical's cocreator Jim Jacobs, who was not involved in the making of Grease 2, has disowned the film.

Sing-along version
 On July 8, 2010, a sing-along version of Grease was released to selected theaters around the U.S. A trailer was released in May 2010, with cigarettes digitally removed from certain scenes, implying heavy editing; however, Paramount confirmed these changes were done only for the film's advertising, and the rating for the film itself changed from its original PG to that of PG-13 (as that rating had not been introduced until 1984) for "sexual content including references, teen smoking and drinking, and language." The film was shown for two weekends only; additional cities lobbied by fans from the Paramount official website started a week later and screened for one weekend.

On May 15, 2020, it was announced that CBS, a subsidiary of ViacomCBS, which also owns Paramount, would air this version of the film on June 7, 2020, which was to be the date of the 74th Tony Awards, which was postponed indefinitely due to the ongoing COVID-19 pandemic.

Prequel
In March 2019, it was announced that a prequel, called Summer Lovin''', was in development from Paramount Players. The project would be a joint-production collaboration with Temple Hill Productions and Picturestart. John August signed on to serve as screenwriter.

Soundtrack

The soundtrack album ended 1978 as the second-best-selling album of the year in the United States, exceeded only by another soundtrack album, from the film Saturday Night Fever, which also starred Travolta. The song "Hopelessly Devoted to You" was nominated for an Academy Award for Best Music – Original Song. The song "You're the One That I Want" was released as a single prior to the film's release and became an immediate chart-topper, despite not being in the stage show or having been seen in the film at that time. Additionally, the dance number to "You're the One That I Want" was nominated for TV Land's award for "Movie Dance Sequence You Reenacted in Your Living Room" in 2008. The film's title song was also a number-one hit single for Frankie Valli.

The song "Look at Me, I'm Sandra Dee" refers to Sal Mineo in the original stage version. Mineo was stabbed to death a year before filming, so the line was changed to refer to Elvis Presley instead. The references to Troy Donohue, Doris Day, Rock Hudson and Annette Funicello are from the original stage version. Coincidentally, this scene as well as the scene before and the scene after it were filmed on August 16, 1977, the date of Presley's death.

Some of the songs were not present in the film; songs that appear in the film but not in the soundtrack are "La Bamba" by Ritchie Valens, "Whole Lotta Shakin' Goin' On" by Jerry Lee Lewis, "Alma Mater", "Alma Mater Parody", and "Rydell Fight Song". "Alone at a Drive-in Movie (Instrumental)", "Mooning", and "Freddy My Love" are not present in the film, although all three are listed in the end credits in addition to being on the soundtrack. (Both "Mooning" and "Rock'n'Roll Party Queen", the latter of which was played in the film as background music, were written in the musical for a character named Roger that was written out of the film, replaced by the non-singing Putzie. In general, all of the songs in the musical that were performed by characters other than Danny, Rizzo, Sandy, Johnny Casino, or the Teen Angel were either taken out of the film or given to other characters, including Marty Maraschino's number "Freddy My Love", Kenickie's "Greased Lightnin'", and Doody's "Those Magic Changes".) Two songs from the musical, "Shakin' at the High School Hop" and "All Choked Up", were left off both the film and the soundtrack.

The songs appear in the film in the following order:

 "Love Is a Many-Splendored Thing"
 "Grease"
 "Alma Mater"
 "Summer Nights" – Danny, Sandy, Pink Ladies and T-Birds
 "Rydell Fight Song" – Rydell Marching Band
 "Look at Me, I'm Sandra Dee" – Rizzo and Pink Ladies
 "Hopelessly Devoted to You" – Sandy
 "Greased Lightnin'" – Danny and T-Birds
 "La Bamba"
 "It's Raining on Prom Night"
 "Whole Lotta Shakin' Goin' On"
 "Beauty School Dropout" – Teen Angel and Female Angels
 "Rock n' Roll Party Queen"
 "Rock and Roll Is Here to Stay"
 "Those Magic Changes" – Johnny Casino and the Gamblers; Danny sings along onscreen
 "Tears on My Pillow" – Johnny Casino and the Gamblers
 "Hound Dog" – Johnny Casino and the Gamblers
 "Born to Hand Jive" – Johnny Casino and the Gamblers
 "Blue Moon" – Johnny Casino and the Gamblers
 "Sandy" – Danny
 "There are Worse Things I Could Do" – Rizzo
 "Look at Me, I'm Sandra Dee" (Reprise) – Sandy
 "Alma Mater Parody" (Instrumental)
 "You're the One That I Want" – Danny, Sandy, Pink Ladies, and T-Birds
 "We Go Together" – Cast
 "Grease" (Reprise)

Television

On August 17, 2009, a television series inspired by the film premiered in Venezuela. The series was produced and directed by Vladimir Perez. The show explores and expands on the characters and story from the film.

On January 31, 2016, Fox aired a live television-adapted special of the musical, using components from both the 1978 film and the original Broadway show. Starring Julianne Hough, Aaron Tveit, and Vanessa Hudgens, the adaptation received positive reviews, especially for Hudgens, and ten Emmy nominations.

On October 15, 2019, it was announced that a musical television series based on Grease, titled Grease: Rydell High, was given a straight-to-series order by HBO Max. Annabel Oakes is set to write the pilot episode and act as executive producer for the series. In 2020, the series' title was changed to Grease: Rise of the Pink Ladies'' and will premiere on Paramount+. Filming began in January 2022, and the series' cast was announced at the end of the month.

References

External links

 
 
 
 
 
 

1978 films
1978 directorial debut films
1970s dance films
1970s high school films
1970s musical comedy films
1978 romantic comedy films
1970s romantic musical films
1970s teen comedy films
1970s teen romance films
1970s American films
American auto racing films
American dance films
American high school films
American musical comedy films
American rock musicals
American romantic comedy films
American romantic musical films
American teen comedy films
American teen musical films
American teen romance films
1970s English-language films
Films about proms
Films based on musicals
Films directed by Randal Kleiser
Films set in the 1950s
Films set in 1958
Films set in 1959
Films shot in Los Angeles
Films with screenplays by Allan Carr
Films with screenplays by Bronte Woodard
Drag racing
Flying cars in fiction
Grease (musical)
Paramount Pictures films
United States National Film Registry films
Films produced by Allan Carr

haw:Grease (1978 film)